The Uprising Tour was a concert tour organised to support the album Uprising by Bob Marley and the Wailers. It was Marley's last tour and the biggest music tour of Europe in that year.

The tour started at the Hallenstadion in Zürich, Switzerland, where Marley performed for the first time, on 30 May 1980, and ended at the Stanley Theater in Pittsburgh, on 23 September 1980, which was Marley's last concert. Two days prior to the Pittsburgh show, after playing two shows at the Madison Square Garden, Marley collapsed in Central Park while jogging, and was told to immediately cancel the U.S. leg of the tour, but he instead flew to Pittsburgh to perform one final performance. He was rumoured to go out on stage to say "Hi" to fans with Stevie Wonder during his performance of Master Blaster but this is not true. Marley went to a few treatment clinics in the United States, Boston, New York and Miami (maybe Mexico). Each place gave him only a month to live. Marley then left for West Germany to receive cancer treatment which eventually was not successful but prolonged his life 6 months more than any medical clinic in the United States predicted, as Marley died in May 1981.

The concert in Dortmund on 13 June has been broadcast in the 1990s by German TV station WDR in their Rockpalast concert series. Numerous other performances from the Uprising Tour have also been taped on video. On 27 June, Marley performed in front of 120,000 people in the sold-out San Siro stadium in Milan.  While on tour Marley performed for the first time in Switzerland, Italy, Ireland and Scotland.

Set list 
The standard set list of the tour mostly looked like the following:

 "Natural Mystic"
 "Positive Vibration"
 "Revolution"
 "I Shot the Sheriff"
 "War" / "No More Trouble"
 "No woman No Cry"
 "Zimbabwe"
 "jammin"
 "Zion Train"
 "Exodus"
 "Redemption Song"
 "Work"
 "Natty Dread"
 "Could You Be Loved"
 "Is This Love"
 "Get Up, Stand Up"

As an introductory theme, the concerts often started with a version of the stalag riddim by Winston Riley, with keyboardist Tyrone Downie chanting "Marley!" over the riddim while Marley coming to the stage (therefore the intro is commonly called "Marley Chant" among fans). Most shows had a standard set list which closed with "Exodus", and an encore set which usually ended with "Get Up, Stand Up". There were also performances of an earlier song, "Trenchtown Rock", which is not featured on any of Marley's Island albums released at that time.

For the short U.S. leg of the tour Marley changed the set list to be similar to the one from the Kaya Tour in 1978: he dropped "Revolution" and "Natty Dread" and added songs like "Burnin' And Lootin'" or "Them Belly Full" at the beginning, or "The Heathen" and the "Running Away" / "Crazy Baldhead" medley in the middle of the set list.

From show to show sometimes an additional song was edged in the middle of the set list, like "Lively Up Yourself", "Kinky Reggae"-San Siro, Milan, Italy; "Roots, Rock, Reggae-San Siro, Milan, Italy and Le Bourget-Paris, France"; "Coming In From The Cold", "Bad Card"-Meehan Auditorium-Providence, Rhode Island, "Kaya"-San Siro, Milan-Italy; "Trenchtown Rock", "We And Them"-Meehan Auditorium, Providence, Rhode Island; "Three Little Birds"-Plaza de Toros, Barcelona-Spain; "Talkin' Blues" or "Forever Loving Jah"-Madison Square Garden, New York City, New York. Live performances of each of these songs happened very rarely during the tour.

Tour dates 

Bob Marley concert tours
1980 concert tours